Ray Jayawardhana is the Harold Tanner Dean of the Cornell University College of Arts and Sciences and a Professor of Astronomy at Cornell University, effective September 1, 2018. He was formerly Dean of Science and a Professor of physics & astronomy at York University. Prior to that, he was a Professor of Astronomy & Astrophysics at the University of Toronto, and an Assistant Professor of Astronomy at the University of Michigan. An award-winning science writer, his primary research areas include the formation and early evolution of stars, brown dwarfs and planets. . His current research focuses on characterizing exoplanets using telescopes on the ground and in space.

As a graduate student at Harvard, he led one of the two teams that discovered a dusty disk around the young star HR 4796A with a large inner hole, possibly carved out by planet formation processes. His group has played a key role in establishing that young brown dwarfs undergo a T Tauri phase, similar to young Sun-like stars, with evidence for dusty disks and signatures of disk accretion and outflow. Disks have now also been found around sub-brown dwarfs or planemos. In September 2008, he and his collaborators reported the first direct image and spectroscopy of a likely extra-solar planet around a normal star.

Jayawardhana is the author of Neutrino Hunters: The Thrilling Chase for a Ghostly Particle to Unlock the Secrets of the Universe (Scientific American / Farrar, Straus and Giroux, 2013), Strange New Worlds: The Search for Alien Planets and Life beyond our Solar System (Princeton and HarperCollins, 2011) and Star Factories: The Birth of Stars and Planets (Steck Vaughn, 2001). His popular articles have appeared in many publications, including The Economist, The New York Times, Boston Globe, Scientific American, New Scientist, Sky and Telescope, Muse and Science. He is also known for organizing innovative science outreach programs such as the CoolCosmos astronomy poster campaign on the Toronto Transit Commission.

Background
Jayawardhana was born and raised in Sri Lanka. He was educated at the St. John's College, Nugegoda and Royal College Colombo and pursued his higher education in the United States. He received his BS degree from Yale in 1994 and his PhD from Harvard in 2000. He was a Miller Research Fellow at UC Berkeley for two years and an assistant professor at the University of Michigan for two years, before moving to Toronto. While serving as senior advisor on science engagement to the president of the University of Toronto, he founded the Science Leadership Program to enhance the communications and leadership skills of academic scientists.

In early 2014, Ray Jayawardhana was appointed Dean of the Faculty of Science at York University. In June 2018, he was named Cornell University's 22nd Dean of College of Arts and Sciences.

Awards
Jayawardhana was named Canada Research Chair in Observational Astrophysics in 2008. He held a E.W.R. Steacie Memorial Fellowship, "awarded to enhance the career development of outstanding and highly promising university faculty who are earning a strong international reputation for original research", from the Natural Sciences and Engineering Research Council of Canada, presented by Prime Minister Stephen Harper at a ceremony in Ottawa on March 16, 2009. He has also been named to Canada's Top 40 Under 40. Main-belt asteroid 4668 Rayjay is named after him.
 Carl Sagan Medal (2020)

References

External links
 Personal home page
 Profile at science.ca
 Profile in Wired magazine
 Big Ideas lecture on "Alien Planets" 
Kruger Cowne, agents, profile

Living people
American astrophysicists
Canadian astrophysicists
Harvard University alumni
Yale University alumni
Alumni of Royal College, Colombo
University of California, Berkeley fellows
University of Michigan faculty
Academic staff of the University of Toronto
Canada Research Chairs
Canadian science writers
Year of birth missing (living people)